The Pacific Rim Rugby Championship, also known as the Epson Cup for sponsorship purposes, was an international rugby union tournament contested by national teams from around the Pacific. The championship was held annually between 1996 and 2001.

The competition was run by the International Rugby Board. In the first three tournaments, Canada, United States, Japan and Hong Kong competed for the championship. The competition was expanded to six teams in 1999 with the Pacific Tri-Nations teams Fiji, Samoa and Tonga replacing Hong Kong for the last three tournaments.

Tournament winners

Successor events
The Epson Cup series ended at the completion of the original sponsorship deal, but the Pacific Tri-Nations tournament continued for the next three years until the IRB expanded that competition to form the Pacific Nations Cup in 2006 (also known as the Pacific Six Nations).

The Pacific Nations Cup, including Japan, Fiji, Samoa and Tonga, was expanded again in 2012 with Canada and the United States joining the competition.

The United States, Russia, China, Japan, and eventually Canada and Romania, played in the Super Powers Cup (later renamed the Super Cup) from 2003 to 2005.

See also
 Pacific Nations Cup
 Super Cup

References

External links
 irb-epson.irb.org archive of official webpage

Canada national rugby union team
Fiji national rugby union team
Hong Kong national rugby union team
Japan national rugby union team
Samoa national rugby union team
Tonga national rugby union team
United States national rugby union team
Rugby union competitions in Asia for national teams
Rugby union competitions in Oceania for national teams
Rugby union competitions in North America
Defunct rugby union competitions for national teams